Anthony James may refer to:

Anthony James (artist) (born 1974), English sculptor, painter and performance artist
Anthony James (actor) (1942–2020), American actor
Anthony James (basketball); see 2010–11 Missouri Valley Conference men's basketball season
Anthony James (scientist); see List of members of the National Academy of Sciences (Animal, nutritional and applied microbial sciences)

See also
Tony James (disambiguation)
Antonio James (disambiguation)